The Communauté de communes de la Région d'Oisemont  is a former communauté de communes in the Somme département and in the  Picardie région of France. It was created in December 1994. It was merged into the new Communauté de communes Somme Sud-Ouest in January 2017.

Composition 
This Communauté de communes comprised 34 communes:

Andainville
Aumâtre
Avesnes-Chaussoy
Bermesnil
Cannessières
Cerisy-Buleux
Épaumesnil
Étréjust
Fontaine-le-Sec
Forceville-en-Vimeu
Foucaucourt-Hors-Nesle
Framicourt
Fresnes-Tilloloy
Fresneville
Fresnoy-Andainville
Frettecuisse
Heucourt-Croquoison
Inval-Boiron
Lignières-en-Vimeu
Le Mazis
Mouflières
Nesle-l'Hôpital
Neslette
Neuville-au-Bois
Oisemont
Rambures
Saint-Aubin-Rivière
Saint-Léger-sur-Bresle
Saint-Maulvis
Senarpont
Le Translay
Vergies
Villeroy
Woirel

Financial responsibilities 

The body has jurisdiction over: 
 Economic & social development, housing and land 
 Schools: preparation and transport 
 Roads 
 Tourism 
 Sewerage

See also 
Communes of the Somme department

References 

Oisemont